The Auditor General of Pakistan is a government organization and the prime and Supreme Audit Institution (SAI) in the country for ensuring public accountability and fiscal transparency and oversight in governmental operations. The organization is expected to bring improvements in the financial discipline and internal control environment in the executive departments for minimizing the possibility of waste and fraud.

Appointments
The Auditor General is appointed by the President of Pakistan. His reports are presented to the Public Accounts Committees (PAC) of the National, Provincial, and District assemblies. His mandate enables him to strengthen the legislative oversight by providing an independent and objective assessment of the process of governance at the federal and provincial levels.

Qualification

Budget 
The budget of the Auditor General is classified as charged expenditure, which means it is not voted upon by the Parliament, giving a degree of independence to the office. The Auditor General is assisted by a staff of about 1,500 qualified officers.

Constitutional position 
The 1973 Constitution of Pakistan lays down the role and powers of the Auditor General as follows:

References

 
 
 

Accounting in Pakistan
Pakistan
Pakistan federal departments and agencies
Supreme audit institutions
Auditor General of Pakistan